Shivaji Bhonsle II of Maratha Empire, later Shivaji Bhonsle I of Kolhapur  (9 June 1696 – 14 March 1726) was the son of the Maratha Chhatrapati, Rajaram I, and his wife Tarabai.

Biography 
He was born in Bhonsle family. Upon the death of his father,  the infant Shivaji was installed as the Chhatrapati  of the Maratha Empire with his mother Tarabai serving as the regent in 1700. His cousin, Shahu I upon his release from the Mughals in 1707 successfully challenged Tarabai to become the next Chhatrapati. Tarabai then set up a rival court in Kolhapur. Shivaji II served as Raja of Kolhapur from 1710 to 1714. At that time, he was once again deposed by his step-mother Rajasbai who installed her own son, Sambhaji II on the Kolhapur throne. Shivaji died of smallpox on 14 March 1726.

Alleged Posthumous son 
When Shahu, without a male heir to succeed to his throne, wanted to adopt a son, Tarabai disclosed in late 1740s that Shivaji II posthumously became father of a son called Rajaram II who was brought up by Nimbalkars of Phaltan, for his own protection. Shahu adopted Rajaram II who succeeded Shahu as the Chhatrapati following Shahu's death. Due to political strife between Peshwa and Tarabai, in order to delegitimise Peshwa's authority which drew from Satara Chhatrapati's own legitimacy in 1752, Tarabai made a show of oath that Rajaram II was an imposter and not her grandson. However this oath was withdrawn and Ramaraja's caste purity was asserted in public by openly dining with other Maratha lords. Ramaraja was later arrested by Tarabai and kept under house arrest until her death in 1761.

References 

1696 births
1726 deaths
Maharajas of Satara
Maharajas of Kolhapur